Željko Rohatinski (3 August 1951 – 12 December 2019) was a Croatian economist who served as Governor of the Croatian National Bank from 2000 to 2012.

Early life
Rohatinski graduated from the University of Zagreb Faculty of Economics in 1974, where he also received his doctorate in 1988 with a thesis titled Vremenska dimenzija ekonomske aktivnosti društva.

Career
He started his professional career in 1974 as an intern at Croatia's Republic Bureau of Planning, and was appointed general manager of the Bureau in 1989. In 1990 he was appointed Head of the Macroeconomic Analysis and Policy Division at the Zagreb Institute of Economics, which he managed until 1998, when he became Chief Economist at Privredna banka Zagreb, where he worked until April 2000, when he took up the post of Director for Macroeconomic Analyses at Agrokor.

He left that post in July 2000 upon being appointed Governor of the Croatian National Bank by decree of the Croatian Parliament on 12 July to serve a six-year term. On 7 July 2006, he was reappointed for his second six-year term at the post.

Rohatinski was a Fulbright Program fellow, and he authored a number of research papers, a book edition of his thesis titled Vremenska dimenzija ekonomske aktivnosti društva, and he also co-authored the book A Road to Low Inflation (published in English by the Croatian Government in 1995).

In December 2008, Jutarnji list, a national Croatian daily newspaper, selected Rohatinski as Person of the Year, crediting him with the stability of Croatia's financial system amid the global financial crisis.

In January 2009, The Banker, an international financial monthly published by the Financial Times, bestowed two awards on Rohatinski in their annual banking awards. Rohatinski won the Award for Best Central Bank Governor of Europe and the Best Central Bank Governor of the World in 2008.

Personal life
Rohatinski was married and had two adult children. In his spare time he liked to play chess and tennis. He was a fan of Alan Ford comics and the Rolling Stones, and his favorite movie was Deer Hunter.

Željko Rohatinski died suddenly on December 12, 2019 at the age of 68.

References

External links
Biography at the Croatian National Bank website
Željko Rohatinski - Vuk samotnjak s Trga burze 

1951 births
2019 deaths
20th-century Croatian economists
Faculty of Economics and Business, University of Zagreb alumni
Governors of the Croatian National Bank
Monetary economists
Scientists from Zagreb
21st-century Croatian economists
Yugoslav economists